Dave Amels (born 1960) co-founded music technology companies Voce musical instruments and Bomb Factory. Both companies are known for detailed and realistic mathematical models of complex physical systems. Amels also plays organ in The Reigning Sound, a garage rock band out of Asheville, North Carolina.

Despite being an inventor of influential digital products, Dave, a garage rock fan and WFMU radio DJ, is famous for only using analog methods of recording.  He designed recording studios and custom analog electronics for high end studios.

As a musician and record producer, Amels has worked with Ben E. King, Lenny Kravitz, Mary Weiss of 1960s girl group The Shangri-Las, and Dennis Diken of The Smithereens.

In 2002, Amels collaborated with Dennis Diken to form the band Husky Team. They released the album Christmas in Memphis on the Confidential Recording label.

Dave Amels relaunched the Cryptovision Records record label in 2009.  Amels worked in A&R for the label in the 1980s.

Discography
Amphetamine Discharge
 Parking – BOA/Roto Records – (RT014) – CD – 1996
Andrew
 Happy To Be Here – The Bus Stop Label (bus stop 1027) cd	2003
Ben E. King
 The Songs of Bruce Springsteen – Capitol – CD – 2000
 One Step Up / Two Steps Back – The Songs of Bruce Springsteen – The Right Stuff (72438-59780-2-9) – CD – 1997
Bingo Gazingo
 Bingo Gazingo – WFMU (WFMU 001) – CD – 1998
Buzzed Meg
 Attack of the New Killer Surf Guitars – Beloved Recordings (Shanachie 5719) – CD – 1997
Chris Butler
 Museum of Me – Future Fossil Records – CD – 2002
Chris Von Sneidern
 Wood And Wire – Mod Lang – CD – 1998
Dave Kleiner and Liz Pagan
 Salesman – Bliss Records – CD – 2001
Dennis Diken with Bell Sound
 Late Music – Cryptovision Records (CRC-3000) – CD – 2009
Engineering Credits
 What's That I Hear?: The Songs of Phil Ochs – Sliced Bread Records – CD – 1998
Handsome Dick Manitoba (Richard Manitoba)
 Ju-Ju Hand on Turban Renewal compilation – Norton Records (234) 2–12", – CD – 1994
Health & Happiness Show
 Christmas to Remember Velvel – CD – 1998
Husky Team
 Christmas in Memphis – Confidential Recordings (CON 3006) – CD – 2002
Jill Sobule
 Forever Dusty – R&D (Ladyslipper) – CD – 2000
Jim Babjak
 Music from Jim Babjak's Buzzed Meg, Vol. 1 – Tex Remy Music Group – CD – 2002
Jon Graboff
 For Christ's Sake! – Confidential Recordings (CON 3004) – CD – 2002
Loser's Lounge
 Sing Hollies in Reverse – Eggbert Records – CD – 1995
Mary Weiss
 Dangerous Game – Norton Records CED-323 – CD – 2007
Michael Shelley
 I Blame You – Bar None Records – CD – 2001
 Too Many Movies (Japan Bonus Tracks) – Crown Japan – CD – 2001
 Too Many Movies – Big Deal Records (9056–2) – CD – 1998
 Half Empty – Big Deal Records (9038–2) – CD – 1997
Reigning Sound
 Love And Curses – In The Red – CD – 2009
 Abdication...For Your Love – Scion AV – CD – 2011
 Shattered – Merge Records – CD – 2014
Richard X. Heyman
Cornerstone – Last Call Records – CD – 2002
 Cornerstone – Permanent Press (PPCD 52707) – CD – 1998
 Cornerstone – Turn Up Records (n/a) – CD – 1997
Ruth Gerson
 Wake to Echo – CD – 2003
The Smithereens
 Meet The Smithereens! – Koch Records (4204) – CD – 2007
 Christmas with The Smithereens – Koch Records (4405) – CD – 2007
 Songs from the Material World: A Tribute to George Harrison – Koch Records (8390) – CD – 2003
Star City
 Inside The Other Days – CD – 2001
Television themes
 Weird U.S. Theme – The History Channel – TV – 2004
The A-Bones
 I Don't Need No Job / "Wha Hey" – Norton Records –  7" – 1994
The Anthony Wayne Sound
 The dB's – Tribute: Stand-Ins For Decibels – The Paisley Pop Label (Pop CD 102778) – CD – 2006
The Breetles
 Pop Under the Surface Vol. 2 – Yesterday Girl Records (YES 002) – CD – 1998
The Creatures of The Golden Dawn
 The Creatures of The Golden Dawn  – Collectables (CD 0698) – CD – 1997
The Dictators
 D.F.F.D. – Dictators Multimedia – CD/LP – 2001
The Insomniacs
 "Pop Cycle" – Estrus Records (ES103) – 10" – 1994
The Insomniacs
 "Time Ticks By" / "The World Disappears" – Umbrella Records (UM002) – 7", Estrus Records (ESD1219) – CD – 1992
The Mod Fun
 Past ...Forward – Get Hip Records (GH-1025) – CD – 1996
 Dorothy's Dream – Cryptovision Records (CRL-1000) – 12" – 1986
The Optic Nerve
 Forever and a Day – Screaming Apple Records (SCALP 104) – CD – 1995
 Lotta' Nerve – Get Hip Records (GH-1015) – CD – 1995
 Leaving Yesterday Behind / "Kiss Her Goodbye" – Cryptovision Records (CR-810) – 7" – 1987
The Parting Gifts
 Strychnine Dandelion – In The Red – CD – 2010
The Philistines Jr.
 Analog Vs. Digital – Tarquin Records – CD – 2001
The Stepford Husbands
 We've Come A Long Way / "Come and Take a Ride in My Boat" – Get Hip Records – 7" – 1993
 Building of Love For Sale / "Bag ManTick Tock" – Cryptovision Records (CR-320) – 7" – 1990
 Seems Like Years / "Kwik Way" – Cryptovision Records (CR-310) – 7" – 1988
 I'm Rode Out / "Seeing is Believing" – Cryptovision Records (CR-300) – 7" – 1985
 Why Aren't You There / "Yeah" – Cryptovision Records (BR-1000-11-1) – 7" – 1984
The Sultrees
 Take Me As I Am / "Contrails" – Cryptovision Records (CR-1000) – 7" – 1990
The Swingin' Neckbreakers
 Shake Break! – Telstar (019) – CD – 1995
 Struttin on Turban Renewal compilation – Norton (234) 2–12", – CD – 1994
 Red Hot – Abus Dangereus CD w/ issue #35 – 1994
 I'm in Love With Me / "Quit Your Belly Achin' Baby" – Telstar (015) – 7" – 1994
 Live For Buzz – Telstar (012) 12", – CD – 1993
 Little Pink Medicine / "Bama Lama Lama Loo" – Telstar (012) – 7" – 1993
 Workin' & Jerkin' / "Good Good Lovin'" – Estrus Records (747) – 7" – 1993
Various Artists Compilations
 Please Don't Adjust Your Set... – Cryptovision Records (CRL-1100) – 12" – 1986
 Declaration of Fuzz – Glitterhouse – 12" – 1985

References

External links
Dave Amels Interview at Tape Op Magazine
Bomb Factory website
Reigning Sound on MySpace
Voce website
AnaMod website
Cryptovision Records website
DA the DJ at WFMU
WFMU main site
Dave Amels Interview NAMM Oral History Library (2022)

Living people
1960 births
American radio DJs
Musicians from New Jersey
American record producers
American male organists
21st-century organists
21st-century American male musicians
21st-century American keyboardists
American organists